SM UB-132 was a German Type UB III submarine or U-boat in the German Imperial Navy during World War I. She was commissioned into the German Imperial Navy on 25 July 1918 as SM UB-132.

UB-132 was surrendered on 21 November 1918 in accordance with the requirements of the Armistice with Germany.

Construction

She was built by AG Weser of Bremen and following just under a year of construction, launched at Bremen on 22 June  1918. UB-132 was commissioned later the same year under the command of Oblt.z.S. Horst Obermüller. Like all Type UB III submarines, UB-132 carried 10 torpedoes and was armed with a  deck gun. UB-132 had a displacement of  while surfaced and  when submerged. Her engines enabled her to travel at  when surfaced and  when submerged.

References

Notes

Citations

Bibliography 

 

German Type UB III submarines
World War I submarines of Germany
U-boats commissioned in 1918
1918 ships
Ships built in Bremen (state)